Benjo Dam is an earthfill dam located in Fukuoka Prefecture in Japan. The dam is used for irrigation. The catchment area of the dam is 2.5 km2. The dam impounds about 2  ha of land when full and can store 208 thousand cubic meters of water. The construction of the dam was completed in 1966.

References

Dams in Fukuoka Prefecture
1966 establishments in Japan